The 2006 Algerian Cup Final was the 42nd final of the Algerian Cup. The final took place on June 15, 2006, at Stade 5 Juillet 1962 in Algiers with kick-off at 16:00. MC Alger beat USM Alger 1–0 to win their sixth Algerian Cup.

Algerian Ligue Professionnelle 1 clubs MC Alger and USM Alger will contest the final, in what will be the 75th edition of the Algiers Derby. The competition winners are awarded a berth in the 2007 CAF Confederation Cup.

Pre-match

Details

References

Cup
Algeria
Algerian Cup Finals
USM Alger matches